The 2nd Marine Infantry Parachute Regiment is an airborne regiment of the French Army created in 1947. The regiment is heir to the traditions of the 2nd Colonial Commando Parachute Battalion 2eB.C.C.P. As of 2008, the regiment is stationed at Saint-Pierre, Réunion.

History 

In 1947, the 2nd Colonial Commando Parachute Battalion 2eB.C.C.P was posted to Indochina, combat engaging until 1953 in two rounds (1947-1949 and 1950-1953), being cited three times at the orders of the armed forces.

In 1954, the 2nd Colonial Parachute Battalion 2e BPC was moved to Morocco and was then subsequently dissolved on July 31, 1955.

In 1955, the regiment was redesignated as the 2nd Colonial Parachute Regiment 2e RPC by regrouping the dissolved components of the 1e BPC, 5e BPC and 8e BPC and then in 1958, designated again as the 2nd Marine Infantry Parachute Regiment. The unit served from 1955 until 1962 in North Africa with the 10th Parachute Division. On 5 November 1956, the unit jumped in the second wave of the French/British attack on the Suez Canal over Port Said and was cited at the orders of the armed forces.

In July 1961, the regiment jumped over Bizerte and broke the Tunisian siege of the French airport installations. The regiment was then dissolved on 5 July 1962 and recreated 1 January 1965 in Ivato, Madagascar from the 5th Marine Infantry Parachute Battalion (5e BPIM).

The regiment was then transferred to Reunion in 1973. Since then, the regiment has participated in various operations: Djibouti (1993/1994), Comoros (1990), Rwanda (1994) and Comors (1995/1996).

In May and October 2009 the regiment performed a parachute jump and participated in a major military exercise in the Bay of Saint-Paul with GAM (Groupe d'assaut par mer).

Traditions 

Except for the Legionnaires of the 1ème REG, 2ème REG, 2ème REP that retain the Green Beret; the remainder of the French army metropolitan and marine paratroopers forming the 11th Parachute Brigade wear the Red Beret.

The Archangel Saint Michael, patron of the French paratroopers is celebrated on September 29.

The prière du Para (Prayer of the Paratrooper) was written by André Zirnheld in 1938.

Insignias 
Just like the paratrooper Brevet of the French Army; the Insignia of French Paratroopers was created in 1946. The French Army Insignia of metropolitan Paratroopers represents a closed "winged armed dextrochere", meaning a "right winged arm" armed with a sword pointing upwards. The Insignia makes reference to the Patron of Paratroopers. In fact, the Insignia represents "the right Arm of Saint Michael", the Archangel which according to Liturgy is the "Armed Arm of God". This Insignia is the symbol of righteous combat and fidelity to superior missions. The French Army Insignia of Marine Infantry Paratroopers is backgrounded by a Marine Anchor.

Regimental Colors 

''Sewn in gold letters in the respective folds, the following inscriptions:

Regimental Song

Decorations 
The regimental colors of the 2nd Marine Infantry Parachute Regiment is decorated with:

 Cited 4 times at the orders of the armed forces.

The regiment bears wearing the Fourragère:

 Fourragère bearing the colors of the Croix de guerre des théâtres d'opérations extérieures.

Honors

Battle Honors 
 Indochine 1947-1954
 Port Saïd 1956
 AFN 1952-1962

Regimental Commanders

Officers and marines 
 Raymond Duc
 Elrick Irastorza

Sources and bibliography 
 Collective,"History of French paratroopers, Literary Production Company, 1975".
 Colonel Roger Fleming, Paras "Free France, Editions Presses de la Cité, 1976".
 Henry Corta,"The Red Berets, Association of Former SAS paratrooper, 1952".

References

External links 
 Friends of the 2e RPIMa
 Le 2e RPIMA en action
 Bizerte: Large maneuvers du 2e RPIMA(Photos), 'Le Quotidien de la Réunion', 7 octobre 2009.

Parachute infantry regiments of France
Marines regiments of France
20th-century regiments of France
21st-century regiments of France
Military units and formations established in 1947
1947 establishments in France